Egil Nyhus (born 23 January 1962) is a Norwegian illustrator.

He was born in Tønsberg as the twin brother of illustrator/writer Svein Nyhus. He took his education at the Norwegian National Academy of Craft and Art Industry from 1981 to 1985, worked as a newspaper illustrator in Tønsbergs Blad from 1986 to 1987 and Romerikes Blad from 1987. He has also illustrated children's picture books, among them several titles about Captain Sabertooth and books written by Tor Åge Bringsværd.

Honours and awards
 1998: The Norwegian Editorial Cartoon of the Year (Årets avistegning) for a caricature portrait of Lars Sponheim
 2012: GRAND PRIX ex-aequo in World Press Cartoon Sintra 2012 for a caricature of Dominique Strauss-Kahn
 2013: The Norwegian Editorial Cartoon of the Year (Årets avistegning) 2011-2012 for a caricature portrait of Anders Behring Breivik

References

External links
Egil Nyhus' editorial cartoons in Norwegian newspaper Romerikes Blad
 High resolution copy of Det siste året, ukeblikk 2013, editorial cartoons by Egil Nyhus 2013
Egil Nyhus at Toons Mag

1962 births
Living people
Norwegian illustrators
Norwegian children's book illustrators
Norwegian editorial cartoonists
Writers from Tønsberg
Norwegian twins
Oslo National Academy of the Arts alumni